István Anhalt,  (April 12, 1919 – February 24, 2012) was a Hungarian-Canadian composer.

Anhalt served as a professor of music at McGill University and founded the McGill University Electronic Music Studio. He also served as head of music at Queen's University, Kingston. His works earned him the reputation of one of the founding fathers of electroacoustic music in Canada. Among his pupils are Kevin Austin, John Fodi, Clifford Ford, Hugh Hartwell, John Hawkins, Alan Heard, Richard Hunt, Donald Patriquin, and Alex Tilley.

In 2003, he was made an Officer of the Order of Canada. In 2007, he was made a Fellow of the Royal Society of Canada. Selections from his correspondence with American composer George Rochberg were published in 2007.

Early life and education

Childhood
István Anhalt was born in Budapest, Hungary to a Jewish family on April 12, 1919. He was son of Arnold Anhalt and Katalin Anhalt (née Herzfeld),  When he was still an infant, Anhalt's parents separated; he lived with his mother until the age of twelve, attending elementary school from 1925 to 1929. Although she had some interest in serious music and opera, his mother was not especially musical, she did have a piano; Anhalt began taking piano lessons at the age of six with a teacher who lived in his neighborhood and later from a family friend until he was twelve years of age.  From the age of ten, he attended the Dániel Berzsenyi Secondary school, failing several subjects at first but later excelling and graduating in 1937. He also attended outdoor musical performances on Margaret Island.

At age twelve, Anhalt  went to live with his father, who had remarried in 1931. Encouraged by his father's love of music, Anhalt developed a good ear for harmony, and taught himself to play the violin. Anhalt learned to speak four languages, Hungarian, German, French, and English.

His father's financial troubles, his half-sister's birth in 1935, and tension between him and his step mother led Anhalt to move again a few years later to stay with his maternal grandparents. At about that time, Anhalt overheard László Gyopár, a peer from a neighboring school, play a piece he had composed himself at the piano. Anhalt recognized the influence of Bach on the piece, and, admiring Gyopár's compositional achievements, decided to learn how to write music and compose his own pieces. Anhalt and Gyopár became good friends, and soon after, Anhalt began to receive private harmony lessons with Géza Falk. Gyopár was attending the Academy of Music at the time, where Anhalt audited Zoltán Kodály's class from 1936 to 1937 before passing the entrance exam and joining his friend at the academy.

Anhalt studied piano with Kodaly at the Franz Liszt Academy of Music; he graduated with exceptional marks in 1941. He also continued his studies for the next year and a half by attending classes from Turkish linguistics to Folklore at Pázmány University and attending a seminar by János Ferencsik for conductors.

Anhalt was drafted into the forced labour service of the Hungarian Army in 1940 during World War II.

1942: World War II 
In 1942, during the Second World War, Anhalt and his best friend at the academy were both forced to enter a forced-labour brigade for young Jewish men. Anhalt's friend was killed by a soldier in the unit. Anhalt escaped from the brigade, disguised himself as a seminarian, and hid until the war was over. He then made his way to Paris, where he had access to music teachers and abundant artistic stimulation.

In the late 1940s, he studied under Louis Fourestier, Nadia Boulanger and Soulima Stravinsky before emigrating to Canada in 1949.

Career

Emigration to Canada and academic position
Anhalt emigrated to Canada in 1949, as a recipient of a Lady Davis Fellowship. He settled in Montreal, and soon met Beate Frankenberg, a biochemist. The pair married in 1952, and together they have two daughters, Carol Greaves and Helen Jennifer Marcello, and two grandchildren.

For twenty two years Anhalt taught analysis and composition at McGill University in the Faculty of Music. He established the Theory and Composition Departments, He established the music composition program for the institution, was chairman for the Theory Department, and developed and directed the McGill University Electronic Music Studio (EMS). He composed continually during that time as well.

Anhalt met George Rochberg at an International Conference of Composers at the Stratford Festival in Ontario during the summer of 1960, and the two became friends. Rochberg was born in New Jersey, and both come from a Jewish background.

1971–1984, move to Kingston 
Anhalt's mixed work schedule of administration, composition, and teaching was one he carried with him to Kingston, Ontario in 1971 when he became the head of Queen's University's Department of Music.  He remained in this position until 1981. He continued to teach at the university until 1984 when he retired. During his years at Queen's University, Anhalt continued to write, compose and teach.  His composition La Tourangelle premiered in July 1975, and soon after he began to work on another piece, which would be his second opera, Winthrop. All the while, he also worked on his monograph Alternative Voices. He became a mentor for a number of his students, many of whom kept in touch with him until the final years of his life.

Retirement and death

After his retirement, Anhalt continued to composer, and to write scholarly and other articles.  He died at the age of 92, on February 24, 2012, in Kingston, at St. Mary's of the Lake Hospital.

Composition 

Anhalt is one of the earliest serious composers of electronic music. His music underwent changes over the years, and can be divided into four periods.  Anhalt has a librettist for his dramatic works, beginning in 1969 with Foci, and ending in 1999 with Millennial Mall.

1919–1958 
Anhalt's early composing focused on a variety of works for chorus, solo voice, ensembles, and instrumental soloists. This period ended with the finalization of his work Symphony No. 1, which won Anhalt both a national and an international reputation.

1959–1961 
The next brief period in Anhalt's musical career was entirely dedicated to electronic music where he produced four compositions, and studying first-hand the newest developments and media during that time, in order to establish fresh and current concepts for his original work.

1962–1971 
From 1962 until 1971 Anhalt reworked, consolidated and expanded his experiences during the two previous periods. He combined electronic sounds with the sounds of the chorus or the orchestra in his Symphony of Modules, Foci, and Cento. Anhalt also adopted a more flexible syntax, as well as a larger musical vocabulary to create new vocal and instrumental sounds. He began to use timbre, timing, and musical densities in new ways in his compositions.

1971–2012 

La Tourangelle is the first of three large scale works created by Anhalt after 1971. It is an hour-long piece that premiered in 1975, in a performance broadcast by CBC Radio. This "musical tableau" was composed for an orchestra of 16 players, five singer-narrators, and pre-recorded tapes for five operators. Its theme is the pursuit of God and meaning, and is based on the life of one of the earliest French women to settle in Canada, Marie de l’Incarnation.

Winthrop is a parallel piece to La Tourangelle, but focused on English Canada. The story is based on John Winthrop, a 17th-century Englishman who was the founder and governor of Boston, Massachusetts. It was completed in March 1983, and calls for a mixed choir, six solo singers, an instrumental ensemble of no less than 30 players, and a boys’ choir. Anhalt described this "musical pageant" as an exploration into the spiritual and personal aspects of a man, depicting how these supply meaning and significance to his actions.

Published in 1984, Alternative Voices is a written study of linguistics as a way of acquiring an understanding of the human voices’ potential in a choral compositional, as well as a contemporary vocal, context.  In about 1967 Anhalt had started studies of the reflection of personalty through the voice in the composition classes he taught; he concentrated on this research while on his first sabbatical leave from 1976 to 1977.  The work received favourable reviews, and was included in the list the 1984 outstanding academic books by Choice.

In Alternative Voices, Anhalt makes recurrent references to some Canadian composers, as well as their music. He discusses the role of Canadian music and composers in the context of present-day thought in contemporary Western art, music, and philosophy. Rhythm, theatre, poetry, performing techniques, sound, speech, and the roots of language and music are explored, their components interconnected, as well as their usage are examined.

The publication of his work Alternative Voices and the finalization of Winthrop occurred in the same year that Anhalt retired from university teaching,.

Compositions 

Stage

La Tourangelle. 1975
Winthrop. 1986
Traces (Tikkun), opera. 1996
Millennial Mall (Lady Diotima's Walk), opera. 1999

Orchestra

Interludium, small orchestra. 1950
Funeral Music, small orchestra. 1951 (Montreal 1954)
Symphony, orchestra. 1958 (Montreal 1959), BMIC 1963
Symphony of Modules, orchestra, tape. 1967
Simulacrum, orchestra. 1987 (Ott 1987)
SparkskrapS, orchestra. 1988 (Toronto 1988)
Sonance•Resonance (Welche Töne?), orchestra. 1989 (Toronto 1989)
Twilight Fire (Baucis' and Philemon's Feast), orchestra. 2001
The Tents of Abraham (A Mirage), orchestra. Premiered 2004

Chamber

Trio. 1953, RCI 229/RCA CCS-1023/5-ACM 22 (Brandon University Trio)
Sonata, violin and piano. 1954, RCI 220/RCA CCS-1014/5-ACM 22 (Bress violin)
Foci, soprano, chamber ensemble, tape. 1969, Ber 1972. RCI 357/5-ACM 22 (Mailing)
Doors ... Shadows (Glenn Gould In Memory), string quartet. 1992

Piano

Arc en ciel, ballet, two pianos. 1951 (Montreal 1952)
Sonata. 1951
Fantasia. 1954. Ber 1972. Col 32-11-0046 (Gould piano)

Choir

The Bell Man (Herrick), choir, 2 bells, organ. 1954 (rev 1980)
Three Songs of Love, (de la Mare, anonymous), SSA. 1951
Three Songs of Death (Davenant, Herrick), SATB. 1954
Cento 'Cantata Urbana' (Grier), 12 speakers (SATB), tape. 1967. BMIC 1968. RCI 357/5-ACM 22 (Tudor Singers of Montreal)

Voice

Six Songs from Na Conxy Pan (Sándor Weöres), baritone, piano. 1941-7 (English version 1984)
Psalm XIX 'A Benediction' (A.M. Klein), baritone, piano. 1951
Journey of the Magi (Eliot), baritone, piano. 1952
Comments (Montreal Star clippings), alto, piano trio. 1954
Chansons d'aurore (Verdet), soprano, flute, piano. 1955
A Wedding Carol (Anhalt), soprano, organ. 1985
A Little Wedding Music (Hopkins), soprano, organ. 1984, Ber 1985
Thisness, "a duo-drama" (Anhalt), mezzo, piano. 1986 (Vancouver 1986)
The Squirrel (E. Barnett), voice, piano. 2002

Writings
"The making of Cento," Canada Music Book, 1, Spring-Summer 1970
"About Foci," Artscanada, vol 28, April–May 1971
"La musique électronique," "L'histoire de Cento," Musiques du Kébèk, ed. Raoul Duguay (Montreal 1971)
"Luciano Berio's Sequenza III," Canada Music Book, 7, Autumn-Winter 1973
"About one's place and voice," Identities: The Impact of Ethnicity on Canadian Society, ed. Wsevolod W. Isajiw (Toronto 1977)
"Winthrop: the work, the theme, the story," Canadian University Music Review, vol 4, 1983
Alternative Voices: Essays on Contemporary Vocal and Choral Composition (Toronto 1984)
"What tack to take? An autobiographical sketch (life in progress ... )," Queen's Quarterly, vol. 92, Spring 1985
"Pst ... pst ... are you listening? Hearing voices from yesterday," Queen's Quarterly, vol. 93, Spring 1986
"Music: context, text, counter-text," Contemporary Music Review, vol. 5, no. 1, 1989
"Text, context, music," Canadian University Music Review, vol. 9, no. 2, 1989
"Thisness: marks and remarks," Musical Canada
Oppenheimer (opera), 1990, play only not music
Record and book reviews in Canadian Music Journal (1957–61), including a review of Varèse recordings, Winter 1961

Further reading
Beckwith, John. 2001. "Anhalt, István". The New Grove Dictionary of Music and Musicians, second edition, edited by Stanley Sadie and John Tyrrell. London: Macmillan Publishers.
Gillmor, Alan M. 1995. "Echoes of Time and the River". In Taking a Stand: Essays in Honour of John Beckwith, edited by Timothy J. McGee, 15–44. Toronto: University of Toronto Press. 
 
 in German: Anhalt at Lexikon verfolgter Musiker und Musikerinnen der NS-Zeit, LexM, University of Hamburg, by Florian Scheding, 2017

References

Sources 
 Gillmor, Alan M. "Eagle Minds: Selected Correspondence of Istvan Anhalt and George Rochberg (1961–2005)"
 Elliott, Robin, Gordon E. Smith. "Istvan Anhalt: Pathways and Memory" 
 Sallis, Friedemann. “Eagle Minds: Selected Correspondence of Istvan Anhalt and George Rochberg, 1961–2005 Review”
 Gazette. "DEATHS"
 Applebaum, Louis, Udo Kasemets. “Istvan Anhalt”
 Gesing, Renka. “Istvan Anhalt: Profile 3”

External links 
 István Anhalt  at The Canadian Encyclopedia

1919 births
2012 deaths
Musicians from Budapest
Hungarian Jews
Hungarian emigrants to Canada
Officers of the Order of Canada
Fellows of the Royal Society of Canada
Academic staff of the Queen's University at Kingston
Jewish Canadian musicians
Jewish classical composers
Canadian classical composers
Canadian people of Hungarian-Jewish descent
Hungarian male classical composers
Musicians from Montreal
Hungarian classical composers
Juno Award for Classical Composition of the Year winners
20th-century classical composers
21st-century classical composers
20th-century Canadian composers
20th-century Canadian male musicians
21st-century Canadian male musicians
Hungarian World War II forced labourers
Hungarian escapees
Escapees from Nazi concentration camps